Ian Paul Mendoza Sangalang (born December 20, 1991) is a Filipino professional basketball player for the Magnolia Hotshots of the Philippine Basketball Association (PBA). He was drafted 2nd overall by the Mixers in the 2013 PBA draft.

Amateur career

High school career

Sangalang came from the Holy Rosary Academy in Lubao, Pampanga but transferred to Lubao Institute (LI).  In his fourth year in high school along with fellow PBA player Dexter Maiquez. The LI basketball varsity team won the West Central Zone Championship against Guagua National Colleges (97–45 Final Score)
and Provincial Championship for Lubao Institute. LI holds the best record in the basketball tournament Zonal (10–0) Provincial (10–0) . He also won the MVP of the league in the basketball event "In The Zone". Sangalang along with Arwind Santos, Dexter Maiquez and Billy Bansil of Pampanga Dragons are Lubao Institute pride in basketball. Sangalang average 25pts per game 20 rebounds per game.

College career
He played his college basketball at San Sebastian College - Recoletos de Manila where he teamed up with Calvin Abueva and Ronald Pascual. They were known as the "Pinatubo Trio". They led the Stags to win the NCAA Season 85 men's basketball championship.

He also took his talents in the PBA D-League, suiting up for the NLEX Road Warriors, which featured the same Pinatubo Trio of himself, Abueva and Pascual.  Together, they won the 2011 PBA D-League Foundation Cup. He also played for the EA Regen Med Regens in the D-League.

He decided to skip his final year with the Stags in the NCAA. He also cut short his last PBA D-League season after winning the MVP trophy.

Professional career

Magnolia Hotshots (2013–present)

He signed a two-year, Php 4.5 million rookie contract to play for the Mixers. While playing for San Mig, he provided quality minutes off-the-bench, and was the key contributor in their bid to win the 2013–14 PBA Philippine Cup championship.

After a decent performance during his rookie season and winning the grandslam for San Mig (now re-christened as Purefoods Star) many expected him to play more minutes for his team.  However, during their season opening game against Alaska on October 22, 2014, he suffered an ACL tear, his first major injury in his career, after he landed badly while fighting for the rebound.  An MRI scan confirmed that he has sustained a partial tear on the anterior cruciate ligament and meniscus on his right knee that sidelined him for up to five to eight months. Despite being sidelined by injury for the entire 2014–15 season, he signed a three-year Php 15 Million new contract with Star during the offseason. He has since returned to action for the Hotshots.

PBA career statistics

As of the end of 2021 season

Season-by-season averages

|-
| align=left | 
| align=left | San Mig Super Coffee
| 71 || 19.5 || .473 || .000 || .558 || 4.8 || .6 || .3 || .5 || 7.5
|-
| align=left | 
| align=left | Purefoods
| 1 || 4.0 || .000 || – || .250 || 2.0 || .0 || .0 || .0 || 1.0
|-
| align=left | 
| align=left | Star
| 34 || 17.1 || .494 || – || .628 || 3.7 || .6 || .3 || .1 || 6.0
|-
| align=left | 
| align=left | Star
| 52 || 20.2 || .497 || – || .702 || 4.9 || .8 || .4 || .2 || 9.1
|-
| align=left | 
| align=left | Magnolia
| 52 || 26.6 || .505 || .000 || .637 || 6.7 || 1.2 || .6 || .6 || 13.4
|-
| align=left | 
| align=left | Magnolia
| 53 || 31.0 || .462 || .500 || .654 || 8.5 || 1.5 || .7 || 1.1 || 15.1
|-
| align=left | 
| align=left | Magnolia
| 11 || 28.5 || .469 || – || .560 || 8.6 || .8 || .4 || .4 || 14.7
|-
| align=left | 
| align=left | Magnolia
| 40 || 29.3 || .451 || .000 || .650 || 6.9 || 1.1 || .6 || .6 || 13.7
|-class=sortbottom
| align=center colspan=2 | Career
| 314 || 24.0 || .477 || .200 || .632 || 6.0 || .9 || .5 || .5 || 10.9

References

1991 births
Living people
Basketball players from Pampanga
Centers (basketball)
Filipino men's basketball players
Filipino Roman Catholics
Kapampangan people
Magnolia Hotshots draft picks
Magnolia Hotshots players
Philippine Basketball Association All-Stars
Philippines men's national basketball team players
Power forwards (basketball)
San Sebastian Stags basketball players